Van Winitsky defeated Eliot Teltscher in the final, 6–4, 7–5 to win the boys' singles tennis title at the 1977 Wimbledon Championships.

Seeds

  Trevor Heath (third round)
  Ray Kelly (third round)
  Eliot Teltscher (final)
  Yannick Noah (third round)
  Charlie Fancutt (quarterfinals)
  Ivan Lendl (quarterfinals)
  Robert Van't Hof (quarterfinals)
  Wolfgang Popp (second round)

Draw

Finals

Top half

Section 1

Section 2

Bottom half

Section 3

Section 4

References

External links

Boys' Singles
Wimbledon Championship by year – Boys' singles